Elizabeth Hamilton may refer to:

Elizabeth Hamilton, Countess of Orkney (1657–1733), born Elizabeth Villiers, mistress to English King William III
Elizabeth Campbell, 1st Baroness Hamilton of Hameldon (1733–1790), born Elizabeth Gunning
Elizabeth Schuyler Hamilton (1757–1854), American philanthropist and co-founder of Graham Windham, wife of American politician Alexander Hamilton
Elizabeth Hamilton (writer), (1756 or 1758–1816), Scottish writer
Elizabeth Hamilton (fencer), (1919–2011), Canadian Olympic fencer
Elizabeth Douglas-Hamilton, Duchess of Hamilton and Brandon (1916–2008)
Betty Hamilton (1904–1994), British Trotskyist
Elizabeth, Countess de Grammont (Elizabeth Hamilton, 1640–1708), British courtier and French lady in waiting
Elizabeth Smith-Stanley, Countess of Derby (née Hamilton, 1753–1797)